Wysieka  is a settlement in the administrative district of Gmina Bartoszyce within Bartoszyce County, Warmian-Masurian Voivodeship, in northern Poland; it is close to the border with the Kaliningrad Oblast of Russia.

References

Wysieka